Aygaz A.Ş. is Turkey’s 14th largest industrial organization according to the listing by Istanbul Chamber of Commerce. It is majority-owned by the Koç Holding, and partly floated on the Istanbul Stock Exchange.

Aygaz brings together the energy firms of the Koç Holding outside the oil and refinery sector. Its subsidiary portfolio ranges from LPG trade to electricity and natural gas. Having been the leader of the LPG sector in Turkey since its foundation in 1961, Aygaz manufactures and sells LPG devices in addition to distributing LPG as auto gas, cylinder gas and bulk gas. Serving customers in 81 provinces with more than 3,800 cylinder gas dealers and auto gas stations, Aygaz also exports LPG devices to 22 countries in Europe, Africa and the Middle East. Aygaz cylinders are delivered to over 100,000 homes every day, while over one million vehicles travel with Aygaz’s auto gas product, Aygaz Euro LPG+, every day. With more than 15,000 personnel working at the headquarters, facilities and dealerships.

Recent activities
In 2011, the consolidated sales revenue of Aygaz reached 5,456 million TL and its net profit raised to 380 million TL.

Subsidiaries and Affiliates
 Mogaz
 Akpa
 Aygaz Doğalgaz
 Anadoluhisarı Tankercilik
 AES Entek
 EYAŞ

See also

References

List of companies of Turkey

External links
Aygaz official website

Oil and gas companies of Turkey
Koç family
Energy companies established in 1961
Companies based in Istanbul
Companies listed on the Istanbul Stock Exchange
Turkish companies established in 1961
Şişli